Gammacoronavirus (Gamma-CoV) is one of the four genera (Alpha-, Beta-, Gamma-, and Delta-) of coronaviruses. It is in the subfamily Orthocoronavirinae of the family Coronaviridae. They are enveloped, positive-sense, single-stranded RNA viruses of zoonotic origin. Coronaviruses infect both animals and humans. 

While the alpha and beta genera are derived from the bat gene pool, the gamma and delta genera are derived from the avian and pig gene pools. Gamma-CoV also known as coronavirus group 3 are the avian coronaviruses.

See also
Animal viruses
Positive/negative-sense
RNA virus

References

External links
 Coronaviruses
 Viralzone: Gammacoronavirus
 Virus Pathogen Database and Analysis Resource (ViPR): Coronaviridae 

 
Coronaviruses
Virus genera